Trelawnyd and Gwaenysgor is a community in Flintshire, Wales. The community includes the villages of Trelawnyd and Gwaenysgor.

It is also the name of an electoral ward which also covers the southern half of the neighbouring community of Llanasa. According to the 2011 UK Census the population of the ward was 1,838.

References

Communities in Flintshire
Wards of Flintshire